Santa Bárbara is a small town in the Sud Chichas Province of the Potosí Department in Bolivia.

The town lies at an altitude of 4774 m at the foot of Cerro Chorolque, a 5552 m high mountain, rich in ore deposits of tin, bismuth, silver, gold and copper, and exploited by the mine "Chorolque" from different sides. It also was the highest permanent settlement of the Inca Empire.

See also 
 Chorolque
 Iskay Rumi

References

Populated places in Potosí Department